Freddy Medardo Ravello Ubillas (born 28 January 1955) is a Peruvian former footballer who played as a forward. He made eleven appearances for the Peru national team from 1979 to 1982. He was also part of Peru's squad for the 1979 Copa América tournament.

References

External links
 

1955 births
Living people
Footballers from Lima
Peruvian footballers
Association football forwards
Peru international footballers
Club Alianza Lima footballers